Helmut Zobl (born 6 May 1941 at Schwarzach im Pongau, Austria) is an Austrian medallist living in Vienna.

Life 
Helmut Zobl studied at the Academy of Fine Arts Vienna from 1960 to 1965. From 1967 to 1970, he was an Assistant of Ferdinand Welz at the Meisterschule für Medaillenkunst.

Work 
Since 1970, Helmut Zobl was working as a freelance artist as coin designer, painter, sculptor etc.  He became one of the most important contemporary medallists of Austria. He has designed many Austrian coins and medallions.
Since 1971, Zobl has been a member of the Wiener Secession. In 1994, he became a member of Deutsche Gesellschaft für Medaillenkunst. He was awarded with high prizes and honours.

Notes

1941 births
People from Salzburg (state)
Austrian numismatists
20th-century Austrian painters
Austrian male painters
21st-century Austrian painters
21st-century male artists
Austrian medallists
Austrian designers
Living people
Academy of Fine Arts Vienna alumni
20th-century sculptors
20th-century Austrian male artists